Elk Mountains may refer to:

 Elk Mountains (Colorado), United States
 Elk Mountains (Idaho), United States
 Elk Mountains (Nevada), United States
 Elk Mountains (New Mexico), United States
 Elk Mountains (North Carolina), United States
 Elk Mountains (South Dakota), United States
 West Elk Mountains, Colorado, United States

See also
 Elk Mountain (disambiguation)
 Elk Range (California) in California, United States.
 Elk Mountain Ski Area in Pennsylvania, United States